The PDP-16 (Programmed Data Processor-16) was mainly intended for industrial control systems, but with more capability than DEC's PDP-14.

Overview
It was introduced in 1971, and a follow-up, the PDP-16/M was introduced as a standard version of the PDP-16 in 1972. The 16/M was nicknamed "Subminicomputer" and described as "a small microprogrammable computer."

The economic strength of the PDP-16 was that it was effective "for designing unique (or relatively low production volume) systems."

References

DEC computers